Periodic trends are specific patterns that are present in the periodic table that illustrate different aspects of a certain element. They were discovered by the Russian chemist Dmitri Mendeleev in the year 1863. Major periodic trends include atomic radius, ionization energy, electron affinity, electronegativity, valency and metallic character. These trends exist because of the similar electronic configuration of the elements within their respective groups or periods and because of the periodic nature of the elements. These give a qualitative assessment of the properties of each element.

Summary

Atomic radius 

The atomic radius is the distance from the atomic nucleus to the outermost electron orbital in an atom. In general, the atomic radius decreases as we move from left to right in a period, and it increases when we go down a group. This is because in periods, the valence electrons are in the same outermost shell. The atomic number increases within the same period while moving from left to right, which in turn increases the effective nuclear charge. The increase in attractive forces reduces the atomic radius of elements. When we move down the group, the atomic radius increases due to the addition of a new shell.

Ionization energy 

The ionization energy is the minimum amount of energy that an electron in a gaseous atom or ion has to absorb to come out of the influence of attracting force of the nucleus. It is also referred to as ionization potential. The first ionization energy is the amount of energy that is required to remove the first electron from a neutral atom. The energy needed to remove the second electron from the neutral atom is called the second ionization energy and so on.

Trend-wise, as one moves from left to right across a period in the modern periodic table, the ionization energy increases as the nuclear charge increases and the atomic size decreases. The decrease in the atomic size results in a more potent force of attraction between the electrons and the nucleus. However, suppose one moves down in a group. In that case, the ionization energy decreases as atomic size increases due to adding a valence shell, thereby diminishing the nucleus's attraction to electrons.

Electron affinity 

The energy released when an electron is added to a neutral gaseous atom to form an anion is known as electron affinity. Trend-wise, as one progresses from left to right across a period, the electron affinity will increase as the nuclear charge increases and the atomic size decreases resulting in a more potent force of attraction of the nucleus and the added electron. However, suppose one moves down in a group. In that case, the electron affinity will decrease as atomic size increases due to adding a valence shell, thereby diminishing the nucleus's attraction to electrons.  Although it may seem that fluorine should have the greatest electron affinity, its small size generates enough repulsion among the electrons, resulting in chlorine having the highest electron affinity in the halogen family.

Electronegativity 

The tendency of an atom in a molecule to attract the shared pair of electrons towards itself is known as electronegativity. It is a dimensionless property because it is only a tendency. The most commonly used scale to measure electronegativity was designed by Linus Pauling. The scale has been named the Pauling scale in his honour. According to this scale, fluorine is the most electronegative element, while cesium is the least electronegative element.

Trend-wise, as one moves from left to right across a period in the modern periodic table, the electronegativity increases as the nuclear charge increases and the atomic size decreases. However, if one moves down in a group, the electronegativity decreases as atomic size increases due to the addition of a valence shell, thereby decreasing the atom's attraction to electrons.

However, in group XIII (Boron Family), the electronegativity first decreases from boron to aluminium and then increases down the group. It is due to the fact that the atomic size increases as we move down the group, but at the same time the effective nuclear charge increases due to poor shielding of the inner d and f electrons. As a result, the force of attraction of the nucleus for the electrons increases and hence the electronegativity increases from aluminium to thallium.

Valency 

The valency of an element is the number of electrons that must be lost or gained by an atom to obtain a stable electron configuration. In simple terms, it is the measure of the combining capacity of an element to form chemical compounds. Electrons found in the outermost shell are generally known as valence electrons; the number of valence electrons determines the valency of an atom.

Trend-wise, while moving from left to right across a period, the number of valence electrons of elements increases and varies between 1 to 8. But the valency of elements first increases from 1 to 4, and then it decreases to zero as we reach the noble gases. However, as we move down in a group, the number of valence electrons does not change. Hence, all the elements of a particular group have the same valency. However, this periodic trend is sparsely followed for heavier elements, especially for the f-block and the transition metals. These elements show variable valency as these elements have d-orbital as the penultimate orbital and s-orbital as the outermost orbital. The energies of these (n-1)d and ns orbitals are relatively close.

Metallic and non-metallic properties 
Metallic properties generally increase down the groups, as decreasing attraction between the nuclei and outermost electrons causes these electrons to be more loosely bound and thus able to conduct heat and electricity. Across each period, from left to right, the increasing attraction between the nuclei and the outermost electrons causes the metallic character to decrease. In contrast, the nonmetallic character decreases down the groups and increases across the periods.

See also 
 Periodic table
 History of the periodic table
 List of elements by atomic properties

References

Further reading 

 Periodic Table Of Elements (IUPAC)

Properties of chemical elements